The 1995 Sessions is a 2009 compilation album consisting of previously unreleased demo tracks previously recorded by Australian singer Dannii Minogue fourteen years earlier. It was released by Palare on 7 December 2009. The album consists of rare and previously unheard songs recorded for what would have been Minogue's then third studio album.

Album history
Minogue began writing and recording her third studio album in early 1994. The completed album, however, was never released following the termination of her recording contract with Mushroom Records who did not take up their option to release it. Dannii had parted ways with UK label MCA Records in late 1993.

In July 1995, the official fanclub magazine confirmed a 20-track demo tape, listing the producers of the album as being Love to Infinity, Ollie J, DNA, One World, The Rapino Brothers, Terry Ronald and Jazzie B and remixes as having been commissioned for the lead track. The edition confirms that two of the new tracks ("Free Your Love" and "Everlasting Night") had been performed at Birmingham's subway city club and (shown on L!VE TV), G-A-Y and again at London Pride 1995.

In October 2009, Minogue announced that the previously unreleased recordings would be remastered and commercially released. The album was originally scheduled to be released in the United Kingdom on 23 November 2009, but was pushed to a 7 December release.

A draft track list of the album was published by online retailers before the listing was finalised. This listing featured a song titled "I Got This Feeling" (written and produced by the UK based dance music team Love to Infinity), however, when the final track list appeared, this track was no longer included. In its place appeared two tracks; "Take My Time Loving You" and the original version of "Coconut". "I Got This Feeling" was removed by Minogue as the original master was damaged and an updated mix of the song would not blend in the collection of material.

Two previously released Japanese only singles recorded during these sessions with Japanese dance music act Eurogroove, "Rescue Me" and "Boogie Woogie", were not included on the album. This was due to confusion over worldwide ownership of the recordings outside of Japan.

Track listing

Release history

References

2009 compilation albums
Dannii Minogue compilation albums